Ransom is the practice of holding a prisoner to extort money or property to secure their release, or it can refer to the sum of money involved.

Ransom or The Ransom may also refer to:

People
 Ransom (surname)
 Ransom (given name)

Places
 Ransom, Illinois, U.S.
 Ransom, Kansas, U.S.
 Ransom, Kentucky, U.S.
 Ransom, Minnesota, U.S.
 Ransom County, North Dakota, U.S.
 Ransom Township (disambiguation)
 Ransom House (disambiguation), various buildings on the National Register of Historic Places

Books
 Ransom (Cleary novel), a 1973 novel by Jon Cleary
 Ransom (Duncan novel), a 1966 novel by Lois Duncan
 Ransom (Garwood novel), a 1999 novel by Julie Garwood
 Ransom (Malouf novel), a 2009 novel by David Malouf
 Ransom (Steel novel), a 2004 novel by Danielle Steel
 Ransom Trilogy or The Space Trilogy, a 1938–1945 series of novels by C. S. Lewis
 Ransom, a 1985 novel by Jay McInerney

Film and television
 The Ransom (1915 film), a lost silent drama
 Ransom (1928 film), a lost American silent film
 Ransom!, a 1956 American film starring Glenn Ford
 Ransom (1974 film), a UK film starring Sean Connery
 The Ransom (1977 film), an American thriller film starring Oliver Reed
 Ransom (1996 film), an American remake of the 1956 film, starring Mel Gibson
 Ransom (TV series), a 2017 Canadian TV series
 "The Ransom", a 1970 episode of Hawaii Five-O
 "The Ransom", a 1967 episode of The Invaders
 "The Ransom", a 1966 episode of Mission: Impossible

Music
 "Ransom" (Pendulum song), by Australian band Pendulum
 "Ransom" (Lil Tecca song), by American rapper Lil Tecca
 "Ransom", a song by Avion 1986
 The Ransom (EP), a 2004 EP by Cartel, or the title song
 "The Ransom", a song by Escape the Fate from There's No Sympathy for the Dead

Other uses
 USS Ransom (AM-283), a U.S. Navy minesweeper during World War II
 Ransom School for Boys, a school in Florida that in 1975 merged with a girls' school to become Ransom Everglades

See also
 Ransom Room (El Cuarto del Rescate), a small room in Peru where the Inca Emperor Atahualpa was imprisoned by the Spaniards
 Ransome (disambiguation)
 Ramsons, a wild relative of chives
 Ransomware (malware), a class of malware
 RANSUM (Royal Australian Navy School of Underwater Medicine), based at Sydney, Australia
 Threshold pledge system or ransom publishing model, a fund-raising system